Belarus competed at the 2015 World Aquatics Championships in Kazan, Russia from 24 July to 9 August 2015.

Medalists

Diving

Belarusian divers qualified for the individual spots at the World Championships.

Men

Women

Mixed

High diving

Belarus has qualified one high diver at the World Championships.

Swimming

Belarusian swimmers have achieved qualifying standards in the following events (up to a maximum of 2 swimmers in each event at the A-standard entry time, and 1 at the B-standard):

Men

Women

Synchronized swimming

Belarus fielded a full squad of ten synchronized swimmers to compete in each of the following events.

References

External links
Belarus Aquatics 

Nations at the 2015 World Aquatics Championships
2015 in Belarusian sport
Belarus at the World Aquatics Championships